Lina Šaltytė-Masilionė (born 9 February 1987) is a Lithuanian female rower.

Šaltytė finished 2nd in B final at 2015 World Championships and qualified for the 2016 Summer Olympics.

References

Lithuanian female rowers
1987 births
Living people
Sportspeople from Vilnius
Rowers at the 2016 Summer Olympics
Olympic rowers of Lithuania